Svitlana Semchouk (born 26 December 1984) is a Track and road cyclist from Ukraine. She represented her nation at the 2005 UCI Road World Championships.

References

External links
 profile at Procyclingstats.com

1984 births
Ukrainian female cyclists
Living people
Place of birth missing (living people)